Major Guy Patterson Chapman  (September 1889 – June 1972) was an English historian and author. He served in the British army in both world wars.

Early life and education
Chapman was educated at Westminster School, Christ Church, Oxford and the London School of Economics.

Military service
Chapman served in the Royal Fusiliers in 1914–20, particularly in France and Belgium in 1915–18 during the First World War. He was appointed an Officer of the Order of the British Empire (OBE) in the 1919 New Year Honours and awarded the Military Cross (MC) in December 1919:
"For conspicuous gallantry and leadership near Ghissignies, on 4th November, 1918. When the battalion was going through Gihissignies in support of the attack, information was received that the left company of the leading battalion had been held up. Under heavy shell fire he went forward to reconnoitre, and found that the supporting battalion appeared likely to become prematurely involved in the fighting. By his energy and initiative in taking command of the situation this was prevented."

From 1920 to 1940, Chapman was involved in book publishing and then served in the Second World War.

Academic career
From 1945 to 1953 Chapman was professor of Modern History at the University of Leeds.  In 1948–49 he was a visiting professor at the University of Pittsburgh.

Marriage
Chapman married Margaret Storm Jameson in 1926.

Works
A Passionate Prodigality, 1933
Beckford, a biography, 1938
A Bibliography of the Works of William Beckford, 1931
Culture and Survival, 1940
The Dreyfus Case: A Reassessment, 1955
The Third Republic of France: the First Phase, 1963
Why France Collapsed, 1968

Further reading
library.wustl.edu
www.firstworldwar.com

References

External links

www.spartacus-educational.com
The Papers of Guy Chapman held at Churchill Archives Centre, Cambridge

1889 births
1972 deaths
People educated at Westminster School, London
Alumni of Christ Church, Oxford
Alumni of the London School of Economics
Academics of the University of Leeds
20th-century British historians
Officers of the Order of the British Empire
Recipients of the Military Cross
Royal Fusiliers officers
British Army personnel of World War I
British Army personnel of World War II